Jane Lesley Aagaard  (born 1956) is a former Australian politician. She was a Labor Party member of the Northern Territory Legislative Assembly from 2001 to 2012, representing the Darwin-based electorate of Nightcliff. She was the Speaker of the Assembly from June 2005 until October 2012—the first Labor member ever to hold the post. Prior to holding the speakership, she had served as Health Minister from 2001 to 2003.

Early life 

|}
Jane Aagaard was born in Melbourne, Victoria in 1956, to John Stuart McIntosh and Jean Brown. She moved to Brisbane, Queensland at the age of seven, where she was educated at Somerville House, a school for girls in South Brisbane.

In 1986, she accepted a position with the Northern Territory Department of Mines and Energy, and settled with her husband in Darwin.

Aagaard also became heavily involved in many aspects of the Darwin community. She helped found the Brolga Awards and Northern Territory Sports Awards, and continued organising both presentations for several years. Not long before entering parliament, she had also organised the city's commemoration of its bombing by Japanese forces during World War II.

When former Chief Minister Stephen Hatton, the longtime CLP member for Nightcliff, retired at the 2001 election, Aagaard ran as the Labor candidate against Hatton's son, Jason. In a shock result, Aagaard won the seat on an unexpectedly large swing of 11.7 percent that saw the previously marginal Nightcliff technically become a safe Labor seat. Aagaard's victory was part of a six-seat swing to Labor that saw the party win government for the first time ever, mainly on the strength of a strong performance in the Darwin area. She was reelected in 2005, picking up a healthy swing of 8.5 percent.

In March 2012, Aagaard announced that she would not contest the next election due to "ongoing medical issues that would require treatment and surgery". In November 2012, Aagaard was granted the title The Honourable for life.

References

1956 births
Living people
Australian Labor Party members of the Northern Territory Legislative Assembly
Members of the Northern Territory Legislative Assembly
Speakers of the Northern Territory Legislative Assembly
Members of the Order of Australia
Politicians from Melbourne
People from Darwin, Northern Territory
21st-century Australian politicians
21st-century Australian women politicians
Women members of the Northern Territory Legislative Assembly